The Berry Vest of Gilbert O'Sullivan is a compilation album by the Irish singer-songwriter Gilbert O'Sullivan, released in 2004. The songs are composed and performed by Gilbert O'Sullivan.

Track listing
"Nothing Rhymed" – 3:24  
"Alone Again (Naturally)" – 3:38  
"Clair" – 3:02  
"Get Down" – 2:42  
"We Will [Gus Dudgeon Re-Mix]" – 3:55  
"No Matter How I Try" – 3:01  
"Matrimony" – 3:14 
"Out of the Question"  – 2:58  
"Ooh-Wakka-Doo-Wakka-Day" – 2:47  
"Why Oh Why Oh Why"  – 3:50  
"Who Was It?" – 2:29  
"Ooh Baby [Radio Mix]" – 3:24  
"Miss My Love Today" – 3:49  
"What's in a Kiss" – 2:37  
"So What" – 4:16  
"Can't Think Straight" – 4:03  with Peggy Lee 
"Doesn't It Make You Sick (Mortar and Brick)" – 3:25  
"Happiness Is Me and You" – 3:07  
"Two's Company (Three Is Allowed)" – 3:40  
"What's It All Supposed to Mean" – 4:20  
"Mr. Moody's Garden" – 3:45 (bonus track)

References

2004 compilation albums
EMI Records compilation albums
Gilbert O'Sullivan albums